The 1949 Boston University Terriers football team was an American football team that represented Boston University as an independent during the 1949 college football season. In its third season under head coach Aldo Donelli, the team compiled a 6–2 record and outscored their opponents by a total of 250 to 108.

Schedule

References

Boston University
Boston University Terriers football seasons
Boston University Terriers football